Astroboyz is a French record producing duo made up of:

Tom Grégoire
Pierre-Antoine Melki, later known as Nius (part of duo soFLY & Nius)

They have worked very notably with M. Pokora in his album Mise à jour.

French record producers